The 1996 Swedish Golf Tour, known as the Telia InfoMedia Golf Tour for sponsorship reasons, was the 13th season of the Swedish Golf Tour, a series of professional golf tournaments held in Sweden, Denmark and Finland.

A number of the tournaments also featured on the 1996 Challenge Tour.

Schedule
The season consisted of 14 events played between May and September.

Order of Merit

References

Swedish Golf Tour